Pritchard is an unincorporated community straddling the South Thompson River in the Thompson region of south central British Columbia.

Pioneer settlers
James Todd and George Bohun Martin were employees of the Hudson's Bay Company (HBC). In 1866, Martin took over Todd's land. Adjacent, Jean Laveau briefly settled to the east, at what became Laveau Creek, and Edward de Champs to the west at what became Neds Creek.

On the north shore, opposite the Martin holding, Arthur Gore Pemberton settled. Preston Bennett and Moses Lumby, who bought south of Martin in 1867, sold this adjoining property to Martin in 1870. The 1885 arrival of the Canadian Pacific Railway (CP) brought a flood of new settlers.

Martin Prairie
In the hills south of his farm, George Martin ranged his cattle. Later, his children Frank, George and Henry established farms in the hills. Initially called Martin's Prairie, the amended spelling emerged in due course. In 1892, Amos and Alfred Herbert established the first homestead. In 1908, the first school for the general area opened. In 1911, the Farmers' Institute was formed and fire destroyed the log school. The next year, a larger lumber building opened. Robert Brett operated a sawmill 1914–1922. When the school closed in 1953, students were bussed to Pritchard.

Pritchard name origin
Watmore came to describe an area along the railway line that encompassed present day Pritchard. Consequently, the school which opened in 1908 immediately east of the wharf was called Watmore.

The railway point at Pritchard may have been first called Pemberton Spur (after Arthur G. Pemberton). In September 1907, John G. Fawcett sold Walter P. Pritchard a property on the south shore. Until 1912, Pritchard drove the Vernon–Kamloops stage.

In the 1911 post office application, the Martin Prairie Farmers' Institute unanimously chose the name Pritchard.

Pritchard earlier community
Mrs. A.R. Johnstone was the inaugural postmaster 1911–1911, followed by W.P. Pritchard 1912–1927.

In 1912, John Hutchinson, built a two-storey house immediately west of the present bridge. The store on the lower level was taken over by daughter Nellie Boyde, when John, a resident for only a year, died months later.

The building comprised 14 bedrooms, a general store, and relocated post office.

The annual fall fairs were held 1913 to the early 1920s. In 1948, Wing Howe bought the hotel, which he immediately closed to the public but became accommodation for Chinese workers.

Being subject to flooding, the Watmore school site was vacated in 1936. Renamed Pritchard, the new school opened that year at 1563 Martin Prairie Rd, about  up from the highway.

In 1950, BC Hydro transmission lines introduced electricity to the area.

In 1957, a teacherage was erected.

In 1965, the establishment of an automatic telephone exchange at Chase introduced dial calling to the Pritchard area.

In 1968, the school closed and the students were bussed to Chase. Formed in 1969, the community association took control of the building as a community hall. In 1972, the abandoned hotel building was demolished and burned.

Pemberton Range
On the benches north of his farm, Arthur Pemberton ranged his cattle. Soon the name changed from Hog Range to Pemberton Range. His  property stretched eastward to Hoffman's Bluff.

When Kilmer was unable to meet the second installment in June 1910, B.C. Orchards sold the property to Messrs. Ross and Shaw after the notice of cancellation expired. The forfeiture was overturned by the lower court, but the British Columbia Court of Appeal reversed that decision. In 1913, the Privy Council upheld the lower court decision. The lack of water rights dashed the plan to subdivide the land into orchards.

A school existed 1913–1965. After burning down in 1929, the school was rebuilt with more windows.

Also acknowledging the name are Pemberton Hill, Pemberton Creek, Pemberton Lake, and Pemberton Gulch. An irrigation ditch from the lake brought water to the Pemberton farm.

In 1966, electricity transmission extended into the area.

Railway
In August 1885, the eastward advance of the CP rail head passed through the locality, regular service having started as far east as Kamloops the previous month.

In 1911, the  train station building was erected.

In 1912, a derailed car structurally weakened the track through the community, before rerailing at the switch. On being flagged down by a passerby, the following passenger train proceeded slowly over the damaged section.

In 1913, double-tracking was extended eastward to Pritchard, not continuing for a number of years.

In 1921, the station was moved westward closer to the railway crossing.

In 1923, a passenger train fatally struck the section foreman walking the track.

In the 1940s, stockyards were erected at the western end of the siding.

In 1951, 21 horses died while being shipped in a sealed boxcar to Kamloops.

In 1958, one man died and two were seriously injured when a train dragged their vehicle from the railway crossing to the switch.

Ferry, bridge, and roads
In the early years, a cross river scow ferry connected to the Pemberton Ranch.

A subsidised ferry was established in 1912. To prevent drifting downriver, a guide cable was installed in 1913.

A fixed span replaced the swing section in 1931, which in turn was replaced in the 1933/34 winter by a lift span to restore navigability to the river. The present one-lane arched trestle bridge, built in 1985, is high enough to allow the passage of a sternwheeler. The Wanda Sue passed by on river tours 1984–2004.

The road which ran to the Martin Ranch on the north side of the train track, past the station, hotel, wharf road, and ferry road, became disused beyond the station after 1950.

In 1874, the Shuswap Wagon Rd was built from Ducks (Monte Creek) to Chase. The right-of-way through the vicinity was present Stoney Flats Rd. In 1925, the route was realigned lower to Stewart Rd. In 1948–49, it was upgraded to highway status. Establishing a bypass around Pritchard, the widening of the highway from two to four lanes was completed for Monte Creek–Pritchard around 2014 and Pritchard–Hoffman's Bluff in 2016.

Later community

On the north shore west of the bridge, the first phase of the subdivision (comprising 38 lots of ), was ratified in January 1972. Approval of the second phase (62 lots) was that November and the third phase (70 lots) was September 1976. Multi-use residential zoning allowed single family duplex or single wide mobile homes. By 1976, problems with wastewater drainage were evident. Launched by Pritchard Developments, the properties were later marketed as flat serviced lots, paved roads, and suitable for mobile homes. By 1998, 144 homes stood on the these lots.

Installed in 1972, the water supply infrastructure was upgraded in 2010. A further upgrade went out to tender in 2022.

In 1989, the shell of the new  community hall was erected at 1714 Duck Range Road. Around 1992, the interior was completed. In 1993, the Pritchard voluntary fire department was established.

Although rodeo schools were held for a couple of years in the mid-1970s and a rodeo held in the mid-1980s, the annual Pritchard Rodeo did not commence until 1994. In 2016, a new grandstand replaced the old one at the Pritchard Rodeo Grounds.

The wastewater treatment plant, constructed during 1997–1998 for the Pritchard Developments subdivision, was upgraded in the mid-2010s.

Immediately northwest of the bridge, Riverside Living is a planned 65-unit manufactured home development. During the 2010s, most of the 24 units of the first phase were erected. In 2013, a district waste transfer station opened.

Agriculture and horse stables primarily make up the local economy. A gas station stands adjacent to the general store/post office. The Pritchard Evangelical Free Church holds Sunday services in the community hall. Pritchard Provincial Park is to the east on the north shore.

One estimate puts the 2021 population as 1,500 for the general area. Based on the increase in housing stock since the 1991 census, the 2021 Pritchard population should number about 1,000.

Footnotes

References

Unincorporated settlements in British Columbia
Populated places in the Thompson-Nicola Regional District